Tyrell Adams (born April 11, 1992) is an American football linebacker who is a free agent. He played college football at West Georgia. He has also played for the Seattle Seahawks, Kansas City Chiefs, Oakland Raiders, Indianapolis Colts, Houston Texans and Buffalo Bills.

College career
Adams played college football at the University of West Georgia.

Professional career

Seattle Seahawks
Adams signed with the Seattle Seahawks on May 12, 2015, after going undrafted in the 2015 NFL Draft. He spent training camp with the Seahawks, but was waived during the roster cut downs on September 5, 2015.

Kansas City Chiefs
On September 14, 2015, Adams was signed to the Kansas City Chiefs practice squad. After spending four weeks with the Chiefs, he was released on October 13.

Seattle Seahawks (second stint)
On October 15, 2015, Adams was signed to the Seahawks practice squad, but was waived on October 29.

Kansas City Chiefs (second stint)
Just a few weeks later, Adams returned to the Chiefs practice squad on November 3, 2015. Adams finished the 2015 season on the Chiefs’ practice squad, and signed as a reserve/future contract on January 18, 2016. On September 3, 2016, he was waived by the Chiefs. The next day, he was signed to the Chiefs' practice squad, but was waived the following day.

Oakland Raiders
On October 5, 2016, Adams was signed to the Raiders' practice squad. He was promoted to the active roster on November 26, 2016. He made his NFL debut the next day playing on special teams in a 35–32 win over the Carolina Panthers.

On October 16, 2017, Adams was waived by the Raiders.

Buffalo Bills
On October 18, 2017, Adams was claimed off waivers by the Buffalo Bills. However, he was waived the next day after failing his physical.

Indianapolis Colts
On February 23, 2018, Adams signed with the Indianapolis Colts. He was waived/injured on September 1, 2018, and was placed on injured reserve. He was released on September 10, 2018.

Houston Texans
On October 2, 2018, Adams was signed to the Houston Texans' practice squad. He was promoted to the active roster on October 6, 2018. He was waived/injured on October 22, 2018, and was placed on injured reserve. He was released on October 24, 2018.

San Francisco 49ers
On November 27, 2018, Adams was signed to the San Francisco 49ers' practice squad.

Houston Texans (second stint)
On December 26, 2018, Adams was signed by the Houston Texans off the 49ers practice squad. The Texans waived him on August 31 during final roster cuts. On September 1, 2019, Adams was signed to the Houston Texans practice squad.  Adams was promoted to the active roster on September 25, 2019.

On April 6, 2020, Adams re-signed with the Texans.
In Week 6 against the Tennessee Titans, Adams led the team with eight tackles and recorded his first career sack on Ryan Tannehill during the 42–36 overtime loss. In Week 12 against the Detroit Lions, Adams led the team with 17 tackles and forced two fumbles that were recovered by the Texans during the 41–25 win.

Buffalo Bills (second stint)
Adams re-signed with the Buffalo Bills on a one-year contract on March 31, 2021. He was waived on August 24, 2021.

San Francisco 49ers (second stint)
On October 5, 2021, Adams was signed to the San Francisco 49ers practice squad. He was promoted to the active roster on October 23. He was released on November 2, and re-signed to the practice squad. He was promoted to the active roster on December 4. He was waived on December 21 and re-signed to the practice squad.

Jacksonville Jaguars
On December 29, 2021, Adams was signed by the Jacksonville Jaguars off the 49ers practice squad.

On March 9, 2022, the Jaguars signed Adams to a contract extension. He was released on August 29, 2022.

Indianapolis Colts
On November 15, 2022, Adams was signed to the Indianapolis Colts practice squad. He was released on November 22.

References

External links
Houston Texans bio
West Georgia Wolves bio

1992 births
Living people
Players of American football from Atlanta
American football linebackers
West Georgia Wolves football players
Seattle Seahawks players
Kansas City Chiefs players
Oakland Raiders players
Buffalo Bills players
Indianapolis Colts players
Houston Texans players
San Francisco 49ers players
Jacksonville Jaguars players